Afrostyrax lepidophyllus is a species of plant in the Huaceae family. It is found in Cameroon, Gabon, and Ghana. It is threatened by habitat loss.

Bark extract of Afrostyrax lepidophyllus has shown pesticidal activity against nematodes and arthropods, including insecticide-resistant strains of lice and blowflies.

References

Huaceae
Vulnerable plants
Taxonomy articles created by Polbot